Haveri is a district in the state of Karnataka, India. As of 2011, it had a population of 1,597,668, out of which 20.78% were urban residents. The district headquarters is Haveri.

Name of the place Haveri is derived from two Kannada words "Havu" which means snake and "keri" which means lake together "Havukeri".

History

Core area of Western Chalukya monuments includes the places Badami, Sudi, Annigeri, Mahadeva Temple (Itagi), Gadag, Lakkundi, Lakshmeshwar, Dambal, Haveri, Bankapura, Rattahalli, Kuruvatti, Bagali, Balligavi, Chaudayyadanapura, Galaganatha, Hangal. It was possible because Soapstone is found in abundance in these areas. Haveri also comes under Core area of Western Chalukya architectural activity.

History of Haveri district dates to pre-historic period.  About 1300 stone writings of different rulers like Chalukyas, Rastrakutas are found in the district. Bankapura Challaketaru, Guttavula Guttaru, Kadambas of Hangal and Nurumbad are some of the well known Samanta Rulers. Devendramunigalu the teacher of Kannada Adikavi Pampa and Ajitasenacharya the teacher of Ranna Chavundaraya lived in Bankapura.  This was also the second capital of Hoysala Vishnuvardhana. Guttaru ruled during latter part of the 12th century and up to end of the 13th century from Guttavol (Guttal) village as Mandaliks of Chalukya, independently for some time and as Mandaliks of Seunas of Devagiri. Shasanas found in Chaudayyadanapura (Choudapur), a village near Guttal, reveal that Mallideva was Mandalika of 6th Vikramaditya of Chalukyas. Jatacholina, under the leadership of Mallideva built the Mukteshwara temple at Chaudayyadanapura (Choudapur).

Kadambas of Nurumbad during the period of Kalyani Chalukyas ruled about 100 villages with Rattihalli as their capital.

Tourism
Examples of tourist attractions in the district:

 Dargah of Irshad Ali Baba, Haveri
 Ranebennur Wildlife Sanctuary in Haveri District
 Siddhesvara Temple Haveri
 Galageshwara Temple at Galaganatha
 Temples at Kaginele (Kanakadasa)
 Hole-Anveri Temple
 Kadaramandalagi Anjaneyaswami Temple
 Mylara Lingeshwara Temple at Mylara near Guttala
 Utsav Rock Garden - Contemporary Sculptural Garden
 Heggeri Lake - Which is 900 acres

Churches at Haveri

 St Anne's Church at Hangal Road, Bharathi Nagar, Haveri
 St James Church at Guttal
Church, Ranebennur

Temples at Kaginele

 Kaginele Mahasamsthana Kanaka Gurupeetha
 Handiganuor
 Ranebennur Wild Life Sanctuary in Haveri District
 Hombanna Bavi Akkialur Village.
 Satenahalli Shatensha (Anjaneya) temple is located just 30 km from Haveri and 40 km from Ranibennur in Hirekerur Taluk.

Hotels Nearby 

 Hotel Nimba International in Ranebennur which ranks as the best hotel in Haveri District.
 Hotel Ashoka in Haveri city where all the politicians of Karnataka state likes to stay when they visit Haveri.

Geography

Haveri District is exactly in the centre of Karnataka, being equidistant from Bidar in the far north and Kollegal in the far south. The district consists of Eight taluks, namely (Rattihalli), Hanagal, Shiggaon, Savanur, Haveri, Byadagi, Hirekerur, and Ranebennur. It is bounded by Dharwad district in the north, by Gadag district in the northeast, by Vijayanagara district in the east, by Davangere district in the south, by Shimoga district in the southwest and by Uttar Kannada in the west and northwest. Before it was made into its own district, it was part of Dharwad District. Haveri is 335 km from Bangalore.

Haveri is the administrative and political headquarters of the district, whereas Ranebennur in the south is a business hub.

Demographics
According to the 2011 census Haveri district has a population of 1,597,668, roughly equal to the nation of Guinea-Bissau or the US state of Idaho. This gives it a ranking of 312th in India (out of a total of 640). Its population growth rate over the decade 2001-2011 was 11.08%. Haveri has a sex ratio of 951 females for every 1000 males, and a literacy rate of 77.6%. Scheduled Castes and Scheduled Tribes make up 13.77% and 8.85% of the population respectively.

At the time of the 2011 census, 77.29% of the population spoke Kannada, 17.70% Urdu and 2.84% Lambadi as their first language.

Notable people 
 Ranna - 10th century's poet, was born in Bankpur, near Haveri
 Kanakadasa - born in Bada village which is situated in the district.
 Panchakshara Gawai - noted Hindustani classical musician, born in Kada Shettihalli
 Sarvajna was born in Abalur in Hirekerur taluk

 Politics and war
 Mailara Mahadevappa - freedom fighter who resisted British rule, is from Motebennur. And his wife Siddhamma also contributed to the freedom struggle, praised as Siddhamati by Mahatma Gandhiji  
 Siddappa Hosamani Karajgi - a freedom fighter, lawyer and politician
 Gudleppa Hallikeri - freedom fighter who is a native of Hosaritti.
 Ramaanand Mannangi - Noted freedom fighter and a Gandhian.

 Art and literature
 Shishunala Sharif - poet and philosopher of the 19th century, born in Shishuvinahala, Shiggaon taluk
 Subbanna Ekkundi - noted Kannada poet
 Puttaraj Gawai -  Hindustani classical singer, founder of Veereswara Punyashrama in Gadag; born in Devagiri
 Galaganatha - Novelist in Kannada
 Vinayaka Krishna Gokak - noted Kannada poet and recipient of Jnanpith Award, was born in Savanoor
 Gudigeri Basavaraj - noted theatre personality, film actor
 Sudha Murthy, Chairperson, Infosys Foundation, was born in Shiggaon
 B. C. Patil - a Kannada film actor from Yeliwala

See also
 North Karnataka
 Tourism in North Karnataka
 Ranebennur
 Chaudayyadanapura
 Galaganatha
 Hangal
 Kundgol
 Balligavi
Devagiri

References

External links

 Official website

 
Districts of Karnataka
History of Karnataka
Belgaum division